Find and Neutralize is a 1983 Soviet action film directed by Georgy Kuznetsov.

Plot 
The film tells about a company of friends who go on vacation to small Siberian town Semirechensk. Suddenly there was a murder and theft of a large sum of money, and the characters decide to help the militia find the criminals.

Cast 
 Boris Nevzorov as Fyodor
 Andrey Gradov as Viktor
 Aleksandr Voevodin as Dima
 Irina Shmeleva as Yulya
 Nina Ruslanova as Nyura
 Anatoliy Rudakov as Vasya
 Mikhail Zhigalov as Joker
 Nikolai Smirnov as Shaved
 Vladimir Shakalo as Sleepy
 Maria Vinogradova as aunt Pasha

References

External links 
 

1983 films
1980s Russian-language films
Soviet action films
1983 action films
1980s heist films